Francesco Masciarelli (born 5 May 1986 in Pescara) is an Italian professional road bicycle racer, who last rode for the  team. He is the son of former racing cyclist Palmiro Masciarelli and brother of fellow racing cyclists Simone Masciarelli and Andrea Masciarelli.

Major results

2007
 1st, Overall, Tour of Japan
 1st, Stage 3
 1st, Stage 5

2008
 1st, Giro del Lazio

2010
Tour Méditerranéen
1st, Stage 5

References

External links 

Italian male cyclists
Sportspeople from Pescara
1986 births
Living people
Cyclists from Abruzzo